Jacob's Cross is an African prime time drama series that premiered on M-Net in January 2007 and ended its 8 series run in 2013. Produced in South Africa, the show initially aired on M-net series but was later repurposed as a drama for M-Net's AfricaMagic channels. The show was given to South African Broadcasting Corporation in April 2009.

Premise
The series revolves around South African born businessman Jacob Makhubu Abayomi (Hlomla Dandala), a son of an ANC stalwart who finds that his biological father is actually a Nigerian tribal chief. Jacob's subsequent desire to build an African oil and gas business empire in the shadow of both of his fathers is set against the backdrop of family feuds and betrayals.

Main cast
Hlomla Dandala as Chief Jacob Makhubu Abayomi
Anthony Bishop as Mr. Prospero Brand
Mmabatho Montsho as Mrs. Lerato Makhubu
Nandi Nyembe as Mrs. Thembi Makhubu
Fabian Adeoye Lojede as Mr. Bola Abayomi
Bankole Omotoso as Chief Bankole Abayomi
Jet Novuka as Mr. Andile Makhubu
Moky Makura as Chief Folake Abayomi, Mrs. Soludo

References

External links 

 Jacob's Cross on Demand Africa

Nigerian drama television series
2000s Nigerian television series
2010s Nigerian television series
M-Net original programming